Horwennefer ( "Horus-Onnophris") was an Upper Egyptian who led Upper Egypt in secession from the rule of Ptolemy IV Philopator in 205 BC. No monuments are attested to this king but along with his successor Ankhwennefer (also known as Chaonnophris or Ankhmakis) he held a large part of Egypt until 186 BC. A graffito dating to about 201 BC on a wall of the mortuary Temple of Seti I at Abydos, in which his name is written , is an attestation to the extent of his influence. He appears to have died before 197 BC.

The Abydene graffito, one of the few documents remaining from his reign, is written in Egyptian using Greek letters, the oldest testimony of a development which would end in the Coptic script replacing the native Egyptian demotic.

References

Bibliography
 The Jews of Egypt: From Rameses II to Emperor Hadrian by Joseph Mélèze-Modrzejewski, Princeton University Press 1997, p. 150

In Popular Culture
A war elephant named Herwennefer can be found in the 2017 action-adventure video game, Assassin's Creed: Origins

3rd-century BC Pharaohs
2nd-century BC Pharaohs
Non-dynastic pharaohs
2nd-century BC rulers in Africa
Egyptian rebels
190s BC deaths
Year of birth unknown
People of the Ptolemaic Kingdom
Ancient rebels